Bates College is a private liberal arts college in Lewiston, Maine. Anchored by the Historic Quad, the campus of Bates totals  with a small urban campus which includes 33 Victorian Houses as some of the dormitories. It maintains  of nature preserve known as the "Bates-Morse Mountain" near Campbell Island and a coastal center on Atkins Bay. With an annual enrollment of approximately 1,800 students, it is the smallest college in its athletic conference. As a result of its small student body, Bates maintains selective admit rates and little to no transfer percentages.

The college was founded on March 16, 1855, by abolitionist statesman Oren Burbank Cheney and textile tycoon Benjamin Bates. Established as the Maine State Seminary, the college became the first coeducational college in New England and went on to confer the first female undergraduate degree in the area. Bates is the third-oldest college in Maine, after Bowdoin College and Colby College. It became a vanguard in admitting minority students before the passage of the Emancipation Proclamation. During early 1900s the college began to aggressively expand and by the mid-1940s, amassed large amounts of property, becoming a major economic power in Lewiston. Since the 1950s, the college has acquired and attempted to remedy a reputation for educating the affluent of New England. Improvements to its reputation were diminished after large losses during the 2008 financial crisis increased its tuition costs. The late 2010s saw a redoubled push for socioeconomic, racial, and cultural diversity as well as a major expansion of student financial aid.

Bates provides undergraduate instruction in the humanities, social sciences, natural sciences, and engineering and offers joint undergraduate programs with Columbia University, Dartmouth College, and Washington University in St. Louis, among others. A baccalaureate college, the undergraduate program requires all students to complete a thesis before graduation, and has a privately funded research enterprise. Its most endowed departments of political science, economics, and environmental science are particularly noted within U.S. higher education. In addition to being a part of the "Maine Big Three", Bates competes in the New England Small College Athletic Conference (NESCAC) with 31 varsity teams, and 13 club teams.

The students and alumni of Bates are well known for preserving a variety of campus traditions. Bates alumni and affiliates include 86 Fulbright Scholars; 22 Watson Fellows; 5 Rhodes Scholars; as well as 12 members of the U.S. Congress; 10 State Supreme Court chief and associate justices; 7 Emmy Award winners; 5 Pulitzer Prize winners; 2 U.S. Cabinet-ranked officials; and numerous CEOs of Fortune 500 companies. The Bates athletic program has graduated 12 Olympians and 209 All-Americans and maintains 32 varsity sports, some of which compete in Division I of the NCAA. The college is home to the Bates Dance Festival, the Mount David Summit, the Stephens Observatory, and the Bates College Museum of Art.

History

Origins 

While attending (and later leading) the Freewill Baptist Parsonsfield Seminary, Bates founder, Oren Burbank Cheney worked for racial and gender equality, religious freedom, and temperance. In 1836, Cheney enrolled in Dartmouth College (after briefly attending Brown), due to Dartmouth's significant support of the abolitionist cause against slavery. After graduating, Cheney was ordained a Baptist minister and began to establish himself as an educational and religious scholar. Parsonsfield mysteriously burned down in 1854, allegedly due to arson by opponents of abolition. The event caused Cheney to advocate for the building of a new seminary in a more central part of Maine. With Cheney's influence in the state legislature, the Maine State Seminary was chartered in 1855 and implemented a liberal arts and theological curriculum, making the first coeducational college in New England. Soon after establishment several donors stepped forward to finance portions of the school, such as Seth Hathorn, who donated the first library and academic building, which was renamed Hathorn Hall. The Cobb Divinity School became affiliated with the college in 1866. Four years later in 1870, Bates sponsored a college preparatory school, called the Nichols Latin School. The college was affected by the financial panic of the later 1850s and required additional funding to remain operational. Cheney's impact in Maine was noted by Boston business magnate Benjamin Bates who developed an interest in the college. Bates gave $100,000 in personal donations and overall contributions valued at $250,000 to the college. The school was renamed Bates College in his honor in 1863 and was chartered to offer a liberal arts curriculum beyond its original theological focus. Two years later the college would graduate the first woman to receive a college degree in New England, Mary Mitchel. The college began instruction with a six-person faculty tasked with the teaching of moral philosophy and the classics. From its inception, Bates College served as an alternative to a more traditional and historically conservative Bowdoin College. There is a complex relationship between the two colleges, revolving around socioeconomic class, academic quality, and collegiate athletics.
The college, under the direction of Cheney, rejected fraternities and sororities on grounds of unwarranted exclusivity. He asked his close friend and U.S. Senator Charles Sumner to create a collegiate motto for Bates and he suggested the Latin phrase amore ac studio which he translated as "with love for learning" which has been taken as "with ardor and devotion," or "through zeal and study." Prior to the start of the American Civil War, Bates graduated Brevet Major Holman Melcher, who served in the Union Army in the 20th Maine Volunteer Infantry Regiment. He was the first person to charge down Little Round Top at the Battle of Gettysburg. The college graduated the last surviving Union general of the American Civil War, Aaron Daggett. The college's first African American student, Henry Chandler, graduated in 1874. James Porter, one of General Custer's eleven officers killed at the Battle of Little Bighorn in 1876 was also a Bates graduate. In 1884, the college graduated the first woman to argue in front of the U.S. Supreme Court, Ella Haskell.

20th century 

In 1894, George Colby Chase led Bates to increased national recognition, and the college graduated one of the founding members of the Boston Red Sox, Harry Lord. In 1920, the Bates Outing Club was founded and is one of the oldest collegiate outing clubs in the country, the first at a private college to include both men and women from inception, and one of the few outing clubs that remain entirely student run. The debate society of Bates College, the Brooks Quimby Debate Council, became the first college debate team in the United States to compete internationally, and is the oldest collegiate coeducational debate team in the United States. In February 1920, the debate team defeated Harvard College during the national debate tournament held at Lewiston City Hall. In 1921, the college's debate team participated in the first intercontinental collegiate debate in history against the Oxford Union's debate team at the University of Oxford. Oxford's first debate in the United States was against Bates in Lewiston, in September 1923. In addition during this time, numerous academic buildings were constructed throughout the 1920s. During 1943, the V-12 Navy College Training Program was introduced at Bates. Bates maintained a considerable female student body and "did not suffer [lack in student enrollment due to military service involvement] as much as male-only institutions such as Bowdoin and Dartmouth." During the war, a Victory Ship was named the S.S. Bates Victory, after the college. It was during this time future U.S. Attorney General Robert F. Kennedy enrolled along with hundreds of other sailor-students. The rise of social inequality and elitism at Bates is most associated with the 1940s, with an increase in racial and socioeconomic homogeneity. The college began to garner a reputation for predominately educating white students who come from upper-middle-class to affluent backgrounds. The New York Times detailed the atmosphere of the college in the 1960s with the following: "the prestigious Bates College — named for Benjamin E. Bates, whose riverfront mill on Canal Street in Lewiston was once Maine's largest employer — provided an antithesis: a leafy oasis of privilege. In the 1960s, it was really difficult for most Bates students to integrate in the community because most of the people spoke French and lived a hard life."During this time the college began to compete athletically with Colby College, and in 1964, with Bowdoin created the Colby-Bates-Bowdoin Consortium. In 1967, President Thomas Hedley Reynolds promoted the idea of teacher-scholars at Bates and secured the construction of numerous academic and recreational buildings. In 1984, Bates became one of the first liberal arts colleges to make the SAT and ACT optional in the admission process. Reynolds began the Chase Regatta in 1988, which features the President's Cup that is contested by Bates, Colby, and Bowdoin annually. In 1989, Donald West Harward became president of Bates and greatly expanded the college's overall infrastructure by building 22 new academic, residential and athletic facilities, including Pettengill Hall, the Residential Village, and the Coastal Center at Shortridge. During the 1990s (and mid 2000s), Bates consolidated its reputation of being a "playground for the elite", by educating upper-middle-class to affluent Americans, which led to a student protests and reforms to make the college more diverse both racially, and socioeconomically.

21st century 
Elaine Tuttle Hansen was elected as the first female president of Bates College and managed the second largest capital campaign ever undertaken by Bates, totaling at $120 million and lead the endowment through the 2007–08 financial crisis. The college announced her retirement in 2011, appointing Nancy Cable as interim president, to serve through June 30, 2012, while the college conducted a national search for its eighth president. In 2011, Bates made national headlines for being named the most expensive college in the U.S., which caused backlash from American academia and students as it indirectly highlighted substantial socioeconomic inequality among students. 

After a year-long search for the next president, Harvard University dean, Clayton Spencer, was appointed as Hansen's successor. Spencer assumed the presidency in 2012, and created diversity mandates, expanded student and faculty recruitment, and financial aid allocation. While some reforms were successful, minorities at the college, typically classified as non-white and low income students, still reported lack of safe spaces, insensitive professors, financial insecurity, indirect racism and social elitism. According to a 2017 article on income inequality by The New York Times, 18% of Bates students came from the 1% of the American upper class (families who made about $525,000 or more per year), with more than half coming from the top 5% (families who made about $110,000 or more per year). According to the Portland Press Herald, Michael Bonney '80 and his wife donated $50 million to the college in support of the $300 million "Bates+You" fundraising campaign launched in May 2017. The campaign is the largest ever undertaken by the college totaling $300 million, with $168 million already raised . In the aftermath of the 2019 college admissions bribery scandal, Ron Lieber of The New York Times noted that need-aware colleges like Bates and others prioritized students who could pay full tuition in the admission process, writing that, "you can get help if you're admitted, but you might not be admitted if you need help." Though it has a large endowment, Bates has continued to struggle to set a fee schedule that students can afford.

Academics 
Bates College is a private baccalaureate liberal arts college that offers 36 departmental and interdisciplinary program majors and 25 secondary concentrations, and confers Bachelor of Arts (B.A.) and Bachelor of Science (B.S.) degrees. Bates College enrolls 1,792 students, 200 of whom study abroad each semester. The academic year is broken up into three terms, primary, secondary, and short term, also known as the 4–4–1 academic calendar. This includes two semesters, plus a Short Term consisting of five weeks in the Spring, in which only one class is taken and in-depth coursework is commonplace. Two Short Terms are required for graduation, with a maximum of three.

The largest natural science academic department at Bates College is the biology department, followed by mathematics, physics, and geology. The social science academic department with the highest number of majors is its economics department, followed by psychology, politics, and history. The largest humanities academic department is the English department, followed by French and francophone studies, art and visual culture, and rhetoric. The interdisciplinary academic program at Bates with the highest number of majors is environmental studies, followed by biochemistry, neuroscience, and classical and medieval studies.

Bates also offers a Liberal Arts-Engineering Dual Degree Program with Dartmouth College's Thayer School of Engineering, Columbia University's School of Engineering and Applied Science, and Washington University's School of Engineering and Applied Science. The program consists of three years at Bates and a followed two years at the school of engineering resulting in a degree from Bates and the school of engineering. Bates College is accredited by the New England Commission of Higher Education.

Its most popular majors, in terms of 2021 graduates, were:
Research and Experimental Psychology (60)
Political Science and Government (58)
Econometrics and Quantitative Economics (48)
Biology/Biological Sciences (30)
History (30)
Biochemistry (26)
Environmental Studies (25)

Teaching and learning 

Students at Bates take a first-year seminar, which provides a template for the rest of the four years at Bates. The student selects a specific topic offered by the college, and works together in a small class with a scholar-in-field professor of that topic, to study and critically analyze the subject. All first-year seminars place importance on writing ability, and composition in order to facilitate the process of complex and fluid ideas being put down on paper. Seminars range from constitutional analysis to mathematical theorizing to disturbance ecology. After three complete years at Bates, each student participates in a senior thesis or capstone that demonstrates expertise and overall knowledge of the Major, Minor or General Education Concentrations (GECs). The Senior Thesis is an intensive program that begins with the skills taught in the first-year program and concludes with a compiled thesis that stresses research and innovation. A feature of a Bates education is the Honors Program which includes a tutorial-based thesis modeled after the universities of Oxford and Cambridge. The program consists of a senior thesis that is defended against a faculty panel. A faculty member must nominate the student for thesis candidacy by the conclusion of their junior year. Under the guidance of the nominating faculty member, the student declares his or her thesis at the start of senior year and concludes it before his or her graduation. The honors thesis is always subject to an oral examination, which is based on defending a dissertation or oral argumentation. The oral examination committee includes a member of the faculty from the same department, a member of the faculty from a different department, the student's faculty advisor, and an examiner who specializes in the field of study that the student is defending and who comes from another institution of high rank.

Research and faculty 
According to the U.S. National Science Foundation, the college received $1.15 million in grants, fellowships, and R&D stipends for research. The college spent $1,584,000 in 2014 on research and development. The Bates Student Research Fund was established for students completing independent research or capstones. STEM grants are offered to students in the science, engineering, technology and mathematics fields who wish to showcase their research at professional conferences or national laboratories. Independent research grants from the college can range from $300 to over $200,000 for a three-year research program depending on donor or agency. The college's Harward Center is its main research entity for community-based research and offers fellowships to students. According to a 2001 study, Bates College's economics department was the most cited liberal arts department in the United States. 

Bates College has been the site of landmark experiments and academic movements. In chemistry, the college has played an important role in shaping ideas about inorganic chemistry and is considered the birthplace of inorganic photochemistry as its early manifestations was started at the college by 1943 alumnus George Hammond who was later dubbed "the father of the movement". Hammond would go on to invent Hammond's postulate, revolutionizing activation levels in chemical compounds. In physics, 1974 alumnus Steven Girvin credited his time at the college as pivotal in his development of the fractional quantum Hall effect, now a pillar in Hall conductance. During the development and production of the first nuclear weapons during World War II, two students researching nuclear chemistry at the college were hired by the United States Army Corps of Engineers as part of the first Manhattan project scientific team.

Atop the Carnegie Science Hall sits Stephens Observatory which houses the college's high-powered 12-inch Newtonian reflecting telescope. The telescope is used for research by the college, local government agencies, and other educational institutions. The Observatory is also home to an eight-inch Celestron, a six-inch Meade starfinder, and the only Coronado Solarmax II 60 in the state.

, Bates has a faculty of 190 and a student body of 1,780 creating a 10:1 student-faculty ratio and the average class size is about fifteen students. All tenured faculty possess the highest degree in their field. Full-time professors at the college received average total compensation of $123,066, with salaries and benefits varying field to field and position to position, putting faculty pay in the top 17% of all public and private universities.

Bates College's faculty includes scholars such as political scientists Douglas Hodgkin, Stephen Engel, anthropologist Loring Danforth, historian Margaret Creighton, pianist and composer Thomas Snow, and author Steven Dillon. Past faculty members of the college include: philosophers David A. Klob and Louise Antony, historian Steve Hochstadt, ornithologist Jonathan Stanton, poet Fred D'Aguiar, English professor and first president of Reed College William Trufant Foster, U.S. Senator Porter Dale, economist Leonard Burman, visual artist William "Pope.L" Pope, musician Jody Diamond, and playwright Carolyn Gage.

Mount David Summit 
The college holds the annual Mount David Summit which serves as a platform for students of all years to present undergraduate research, creative art, performance, and various other academic projects and is named after the campus' Mount David. Presentations at the summit include various discipline-centered projects, themed panel discussions, films Q & A's, as well as other activities in the Lewiston area. Started in 2002, the summit is held in Pettengill Hall, and on April 1, 2016, held its 15th summit.

Admissions

Standards and selectivity 

For the class of 2023, Bates admitted 12.1% of all applicants, the lowest-ever for the college. During the 2018–19 admission rounds, Bates accepted seven transfer students from 205 applicants, yielding a 3.4% acceptance rate. The college has had years where no transfer applicants were accepted, such as in 2016–17, where all 170 applicants failed to gain admission. In 2015, the college had a 1.6% acceptance rate for wait-listed students. U.S. News & World Report classifies Bates as "most selective", with The Princeton Review designated it with a "selectivity rating" of 96 out of 99. The college had its highest admit rate after the 2008 financial crisis, during the 2008–09 year, accepting 30.4% of applicants.

The average high school GPA for the class of 2019 was an unweighted 3.71. The average SAT Score was 2135 (715 Critical Reasoning, 711 Mathematics and 709 Writing), and the average ACT score range was 28 to 32. Bates has a Test Optional Policy, which gives the applicant the choice to not send in their standardized test scores. Bates' non-submitting students averaged only 0.05 points lower on their collegiate grade point average. The Wall Street Journal found that Bates had some of the "toughest rejection letters" in the U.S. during the late-2000s. The college later apologized and issued a statement assuring that it makes an effort to "[deny] the student's application… not [reject] the student".

Cost of attendance and financial aid 
For the 2016–17 academic year, Bates charged a comprehensive price (tuition, room and board, and associated fees) of $66,550. The college's tuition is the same for in-state and out-of-state students. Bates practices need-blind admission for students who are U.S. citizens, permanent residents, DACA status students, undocumented students, or who graduate from a high school within the United States, and meets all of demonstrated need for all admitted students, including admitted international students. During the 2016–17 academic year the college dispensed $37.9 million in financial aid with $4.3 million to undocumented students.

Bates does not offer merit or athletic scholarships. Although Bates is often the most expensive school to attend in its athletic conference, the college covers 100% of financial need for students, and has an average financial package of $42,217. , 44% of students utilize financial aid. Bates offers the Direct "+" Loan, Direct Student Loans, Pell Grants, Perkins Loan, Supplementary Educational Opportunity Grants (SEOG), and Work-Study Program.

Bates has the second lowest percentage of Pell Grant recipients in the United States, below only Fairfield University.

Demographics 
For the class of 2019, the gender demographic of the college breaks down to 49% male and 51% female. 27% of U.S. students are students of color (domestic and international) and 13% of admitted students are first generation to college. The educational background for admitted students are mixed: 49% of students attended public schools and 51% attended private schools. About 90% of this incoming class (of those from schools that officially rank students) graduated in the top decile of their high school classes. Bates has a 95% freshman retention rate. A significant portion of 45% of all applicants, transfer and non-transfer, are from New England. About 89% of students are out-of-state, (all 50 states are represented), and the college has students from 73 countries.

Rankings and reputation 

Bates is noted as one of the Little Ivies, along with universities such as Tufts, Bowdoin, Colby, Amherst, Middlebury, Connecticut College, Hamilton, Trinity, Wesleyan, and Williams. The college is also known as one of the Hidden Ivies, which includes much larger research universities such as Johns Hopkins and Stanford University. The 2020 annual ranking by U.S. News & World Report ranked Bates tied for 21st overall best liberal arts college in the nation. Forbes ranked Bates 39th in its 2019 national rankings of 650 U.S. colleges, universities and service academies, and 11th among liberal arts colleges. The college's highest ranking on the Forbes tables was 8th in the U.S. during its 2018 listing. Washington Monthly ranked Bates 17th in 2019 among 214 liberal arts colleges in the U.S. based on its contribution to the public good, as measured by social mobility, research, and promoting public service. The peak position Bates has held on the Washington Monthly ranking was 6th in 2013.

For the 2017–18 academic year, Niche, formerly College Prowler, graded Bates with an overall grade of an 'A+' noting an 'A+' for academics, 'A+' for campus food, 'A+' for technology, 'A' for administration, 'A−' for diversity, and an 'A' for campus quality. During the 2019 Niche rankings, Bates was designated the 14th best liberal arts college in the country. , Alumni Factor, which measures alumni success, ranks Bates first in Maine and among the top schools nationally. In 2018, Bates produced 23 Bates students who received Fulbright fellowships, attaining the distinction of "Fulbright Top Producer", and subsequently breaking the college's previous record, and ranking Bates first in the United States. The Peace Corps placed Bates 22nd, out of all liberal arts colleges, for international charity involvement.

In 2017, according to The Washington Post–a paper that aggregates university rankings from six different publications–the undergraduate program is the 17th best in the United States. On September 20, 2016, PayScale released a report of 1,000 universities and their average graduate earning potential for the 2016–17 year. A Bates degree was worth approximately $120,000 in average salary making it the 13th highest among universities, and the third highest among liberal arts in the U.S. In 2016, two Bates alumni were featured on the Forbes' 30 Under 30 list.

Campus 

Bates is in a former mill town, Lewiston, which has a large French Canadian ethnic presence due to migration from Quebec in the 19th century. The college is known for cultural strains with the town, townspeople describing Bates as a "leafy oasis of privilege." The overall architectural design of the college can be traced through the Colonial Revival architecture movement, and has distinctive Neoclassical, Georgian, Colonial, and Gothic features. The earliest buildings of the college were directly designed by Boston architect Gridley J.F. Bryant, and subsequent buildings follow his overall architectural template. Colonial restoration influence can be seen in the architecture of certain buildings, however many of the off campus houses' architecture was heavily influenced by the Victorian era. Many buildings on campus share design parallels with Dartmouth College, University of Cambridge, Yale University, and Harvard University.

Bates has a 133-acre main campus and maintains the 600-acre Bates-Morse Mountain Conservation Area, as well as an 80-acre Coastal Center fresh water habitat at Shortridge. The eastern campus is situated around Lake Andrews, where many residential halls are located. The quad of the campus connects academic buildings, athletics arenas, and residential halls. Bates College houses over 1 million volumes of articles, papers, subscriptions, audio/video items and government articles among all three libraries and all academic buildings. The George and Helen Ladd Library houses 620,000 catalogued volumes, 2,500 serial subscriptions and 27,000 audio/video items. Coram Library houses almost 200,000 volumes of articles, subscriptions and audio/video items. Approximately 150,000 volumes of texts, papers, and alumnus work are housed within academic buildings.

The most notable items in the library's collection include, copies of the original Constitution of Maine, personal correspondence of James K. Polk and Hannibal Hamlin, original academic papers of Henry Clay, personal documents of Edmund Muskie, original printings of newspaper articles written by James G. Blaine, and selected collections of other prominent religious, political and economic figures, both in Maine, and the United States.

The campus provides 33 Victorian Houses, 9 residential halls, and one residential village. The college maintains 12 academic buildings with Lane Hall serving as the administration building on campus. Lane Hall houses the offices of the president, dean of the faculty, registrar, and provost, among others.

Olin Arts Center 
The Olin Arts Center maintains three teaching sound proof studios, five class rooms, five seminar rooms, ten practice rooms with pianos, and a 300-seat grand recital hall. It holds the college's Steinway concert grand piano, Disklavier, William Dowd harpsichord, and their 18th century replica forte piano. The studios are modernized with computers, synthesizers, and various recording equipment. The center houses the departments of Art and Music, and was given to Bates by the F. W. Olin Foundation in 1986. The center has had numerous Artists in Residence, such as Frank Glazer, and Leyla McCalla. The Olin Arts Center has joined with the Maine Music Society to produce musical performances throughout Maine.

Museum of Art 

Founded in 1955, the Bates College Museum of Art holds contemporary and historic pieces. In the 1930s, the college secured a private holding from the Museum of Modern Art of Vincent van Gogh's Starry Night, for students participating in the 'Bates Plan'. It holds 5,000 pieces and objects of contemporary domestic and international art. The museum holds over 100 original artworks, photographs and sketches from Marsden Hartley. The MoA offers numerous lectures, artist symposiums, and workshops. The entire space is split into three components, the larger Upper Gallery, smaller Lower Gallery, and the Synergy Gallery which is primarily used for student exhibits and research. Almost 20,000 visitors are attracted to the MoA annually.

Bates-Morse Mountain Area 
This conservation area of 600 acres is available to Bates students for academic, extracurricular, and research purposes. This area is mainly salt marshes and coastal uplands. The college participates in preserving the plants, animals and natural ecosystems within this area as a part of their Community-Engaged Learning Program. Due to overall size, the site is frequently used by other Maine schools such as Bowdoin College for their Nordic Skiing practices.

Coastal Center at Shortridge 
This coastal center owned by Bates College, provides various academic programs, lectures, extracurricular activities, and research endeavors for students. 80 acres of wetlands, and woodlands with a fresh water pond, are available to numerous science departments and programs at Bates. There are two buildings on the land, a conference building, which can accommodate 15 people overnight, and a laboratory structured with an art studio on the upper floor. This area is also home to the Shortridge Summer Residency Program which provides students, faculty and researchers to work and study on the coastal land of Shortridge during the summer. Science majors and faculty work on site-based issues such as coastal changes, sea level fluctuations and public policy.

Student life 

The college's dining services have been featured on numerous national publications.

In 2015, the college's dining program was ranked 6th by The Princeton Review, and 8th by Niche in the United States. The college's dining services received the grade of 'A+' by Niche in 2012, 2013, 2014, 2015, 2016, and 2017. The college holds one main dining area and offers two floors of seating. All meals and catered events on campus are served by Bates Dining Services, which makes a concentrated effort to purchase foods from suppliers and producers within the state of Maine, like Oakhurst Dairy and others. The Den serves as an on-campus restaurant. While on campus, enrolled students and faculty have access to round-the-clock emergency medical services and security protection.

The college also holds an annual "Harvest Dinner" during Thanksgiving that features a school-wide dining experience including a New England buffet and live musical performances. Martin Luther King Day at Bates is celebrated annually with classes being canceled, and performances, events, keynote talks are held in observance. It is a day marked by keynotes from well known scholars who speak on the subjects of race, justice, and equality in America. In 2016, the college invited Jelani Cobb to speak at the college on MLK Day. The college offers students 110 clubs and organizations on campus. Among those is the competitive eating club, the Fat Cats, Ultimate Frisbee, and the student government. The largest club is the Outing Club, which leads canoeing, kayaking, rafting, camping and backpacking trips throughout Maine. Although Bates has since conception, rejected fraternities and sororities, various social groups exist.

Student media

The Bates Student 

Bates College's oldest operating newspaper is The Bates Student, created in 1873. It is one of the oldest continuously published college weeklies in the United States, and the oldest co-ed college weekly in the country. Alumni of the student media programs at Bates have won the Pulitzer Prize, and have their later work featured on major news sources. It circulates approximately 1,900 copies around the campus and Lewiston area. Since 1990, there has been an electronic version of the newspaper online. The newspaper provides access free of charge to a searchable database of articles stretching back to its inception on its website. In 2021, the college administration requested the student newspaper to retract an article that focused on the ongoing unionization among faculty staff members and replace it with an article that also included anti-union arguments. Some students accused the administration of censorship over this issue.

WRBC 
WRBC is the college radio station of Bates College and was first aired in 1958. Originally started as an AM station at Bates, it began with the efforts of rhetoric professor and debate coach Brooks Quimby. It is ranked by the 2015 Princeton Review as the 12th best college radio station in the United States and Canada, making it the top college radio in the New England Small College Athletic Conference.

A cappella 
There are five auditioned a cappella groups on campus. The Deansmen and the Manic Optimists are all-male, the Merminaders are all-female, and the co-ed groups are known as TakeNote and the Crosstones.

Brooks Quimby Debate Council 

Arguably the most well-known student organization at Bates is the Brooks Quimby Debate Council, due to endowment allocation, relative participation rate, awards and historical significance. The formation of the team predates the establishment of the college itself as the debate society was founded within the Maine State Seminary making it the oldest coeducational college debate society in the United States. It was headed by Bates alumnus and teacher Brooks Quimby and became the first intercollegiate international debate team in the United States. The Quimby Debate Society has been noted as "America's most prestigious debating society," and the "playground of the powerful." During the 1930s, the debate society was subject to 'The Quimby Institute' which pitted each and every debate student against Brooks Quimby himself. This is where he began to engage heated debate with them that stressed "flawless assertions" and resulted in every error made by the student to be carefully scrutinized and teased. Bates has an annual and traditional debate with Oxford, Cambridge and Dartmouth College. It competes in the American Parliamentary Debate Association domestically, and competes in the World Universities Debating Championships, internationally. The debate council was ranked 5th nationally in 2013, the year prior year ranking 9th in the world.

Traditions

Ivy Day 
The class graduates participate in an Ivy Day which installs a granite placard onto one of the academic or residential buildings on campus. They serve as a symbol of the class and their respective history both academically and socially. Some classes donate to the college, in the form gates, facades, and door outlines, by inscribing or creating their own version of symbolic icons of the college's seal or other prominent insignia. This usually occurs on graduation day, but may occur on later dates with alumni returning to the campus. This tradition is shared with the University of Pennsylvania and Princeton University. On Ivy Day, members of Phi Beta Kappa are announced.

Winter Carnival 

This tradition is nearly a century old. The college has held, on odd to even years, a Winter Carnival which comprises a themed four-day event that includes performances, dances, and games. Past Winter Carnivals have included "a Swiss Olympic skier swooshing down Mount David", faculty and student football games, faculty and administration skits, oversized snow sculptures, "serenading of the dormitories", and an expeditions to Camden. When alumnus Edmund Muskie was governor, he participated in a torch relay from Augusta to Lewiston in celebration of the 1960 Winter Olympics.

Robert F. Kennedy, with his naval classmates, built a replica of their boat back in Massachusetts out of snow in front of Smith Hall, during their carnival. This tradition is second only to Dartmouth College as the oldest of its kind in the United States. Students are known to participate in what has been colloquially termed as the 'Dartmouth Challenge', which consists of alcohol related activities, closely related to parent ritual Newman Day, a tradition the college started in the 1970s. The carnival has been hosted by the Bates Outing Club since its conception.

Puddle Jump 
On the Friday of Winter Carnival the Bates College Outing Club initiates the annual Puddle Jump. A hole is cut by a chainsaw or by the original axe used in the inaugural Puddle Jump of 1975, in Lake Andrews. Students from all class years jump into the hole, sometimes in costumes, to celebrate, "exuberance at the end of a hard winter." By mid-evening, they celebrate with donuts, cider and a cappella performances.

Athletics 

The college's official mascot is the bobcat, and official color is garnet. The college athletically competes in the NCAA Division III New England Small College Athletic Conference (NESCAC), which also includes Amherst, Connecticut, Hamilton, Middlebury, Trinity, Tufts, Wesleyan, Williams, and "Maine Big Three" rivals Bowdoin and Colby in the Colby-Bates-Bowdoin Consortium. This is one of the oldest football rivalries in the United States. This consortium is a series of historically highly competitive football games ending in the championship game between the three schools. Bates is the holder of the winning streak, but also has the record for biggest loss in the athletic conference.

Overall the college leads the Colby-Bates-Bowdoin Consortium in wins. Bates has won this championship at total of eleven times including 2014, 2015, and in 2016 won it again with a 24–7 win over Bowdoin, after their 21–19 home victory over Colby.

According to U.S. Rowing, the Women's Rowing Team is ranked 1st in the New England Small College Athletic Conference, and 1st overall in NCAA Division III Rowing, . In the 2015 season, the women's rowing team was the most decorated rowing team in collegiate racing while also being the first to sweep every major rowing competition in its athletic conference in the history of NCAA Division III athletics. In 2015, the men's rowing team had the fastest ascension in rankings of any sport in its athletic conference and is the NESCAC Rowing Champion. Bates has the 4th highest NESCAC title hold, is ranked 5th in its athletic conference and 15th in Division III athletics. , the college has graduated a total of 12 Olympians, one of whom won the Olympic Gold Medal rowing for Canada at the 2008 Beijing Olympics. The all-time leader of the Chase Regatta is Bates with a total of 14 composite wins, followed by Colby's 5 wins, concluding with Bowdoin's 2 wins.

The ice hockey team is the first team to win the NESCAC Club Ice Hockey Championships four times in a row. , the men's club ice hockey team is ranked 5th in the Northeast, and 25th overall in the NESCHA rankings. In the winter of 2008, the college's Nordic Skiing team sent students who were the highest ranked skiers in the Eastern Intercollegiate Ski Association and placed 4th in the 2008 NCAA Division I Championship. In April 2005, the college's athletic program was ranked top 5% of national athletics programs. The Men's Squash Team won the national championships in 2015, and 2016, with the winning student being the first in the history of the athletic conference, to be named the All American all four years he played for the college. The men's track field is the first team in the history of Maine to have seven consecutive wins of the state championship, a feat completed in 2016.
Bates maintains 31 varsity teams, and 9 club teams, including sailing, cycling, ice hockey, rugby, and water polo.

Athletic facilities 
The college's athletic facilities include:
Alumni Gymnasium & Merrill Gymnasium
Bates Squash Center & the Wallach Tennis Center
Campus Avenue Field & Garcelon Field
Clifton Daggett Gray Athletic Building & the Davis Fitness Center
Leahey Baseball Pitch & the Lafayette Street Pitch
2,040 seat Underhill Arena Ice Rink
Rowing Boathouse & Sailing Boathouse
Russell Street Track
300 seat enclosed Tarbell Pool

Sustainability 

In 2005, President Elaine Tuttle Hansen stated, "Bates will purchase its entire electricity supply from renewable energy sources in Maine" and secured a new contract, adding a premium of $76,000 to their energy supply. Bates College signed onto the American College and University President's Climate Commitment in 2007. In April 2008, the college completed its dining complex named "The Commons" at a cost of approximately $24 million. The complex is 60,000 square feet, certified LEED Silver, and features occupancy sensors, anti-HCFC refrigerants, natural ventilation, heat islands, and five separate dining areas with almost 70% of the walls being glass paneling.

In 2009, the college was given its third $5,000 grant allocation by the Hobart Center for Foodservice Sustainability which cited Bates as "having the best sustainability program among numerous entrants nationwide". In 2010, the college was named one of 15 colleges in the United States to the "Green Honor Roll", by Princeton Review. Bates mitigates 99% of emissions via electrical consumption and purchases all of its energy from Maine Renewable Resources. The college expended $1.1 million of its endowment to install lighting retrofits, occupancy sensors, motor system replacements and energy generating mechanisms. Select buildings at the college are open 24/7, thus requiring extra energy, due to this the college has implemented technology that places buildings on "stand-by" mode while minimum occupancy is attained to preserve energy. The practice is set to reduce the college's overall emissions levels by 5 to 10 percent. Overall, the academic buildings and residential halls are equipped with day-lighting techniques, motion sensors, and efficient heating systems. Bates expended $1.5 million to implement a central plant that provides steam for heating for up to 80% of all on-campus establishments. The central plant is equipped with a modernized biomass systems and a miniature back-pressure steam turbine which reduces campus electricity consumption by 5%. The college also installed a $2.7 million 900kW hyper-roterized turbine that accounts for nearly one tenth of the campus' entire energy consumption. Bates was the first food-service operation in higher education to join the Green Restaurant Association. In 2013, the environmental practices of the college's dining services were placed along with Harvard University, and Northeastern University, as the best in the United States by the Green Restaurant Association; it earned three out of three stars, the only educational institution in Maine to do so.

Bates maintains numerous environmental clubs and initiative such as Green Certification, which recognizes students who commit to sustainable policies and practices, Green Bike, which offers students access to bicycles for use on and off campus for free, and the Bates Action Energy Movement in which students participate in "both on-campus and nationwide environmental events and engage students with discussions on climate change and other pressing ecological crises." The Bates College Museum of Art, offers programs such as the Green Horizons Program that showcase environmentalism in art, society, and culture.

The United States Environmental Protection Agency honored Bates as a member of the Green Power Leadership Club due to the fact 96% of energy used on campus is from renewable resources. All newly developed buildings and facilities are built to LEED Silver and Gold standards. The college achieved complete carbon neutrality in 2019, as a result of campus-wide conservation efforts and specific initiatives in its implementation plan.

Notable alumni

Bates alumni have included leaders in science, religion, politics, the Peace Corps, medicine, law, education, communications, and business; and acclaimed actors, architects, artists, astronauts, engineers, human rights activists, inventors, musicians, philanthropists, and writers. , there are 24,000 Bates College alumni. The college is associated, through alumni and academic staff, with the following intellectual, scientific, and social contributions to human advancement, including laying the foundations of braille typography (Frank Haven Hall), "The Kingdom" (Frank Sandford), the American civil rights movement (Benjamin Mays), basketball's fast break (Frank Keaney), the Boston Red Sox (Harry Lord, Charles Small), the fractional quantum Hall effect (Steven Girvin), and organic photochemistry (George Hammond).

In national and international government, alumni of the college include the 58th U.S. Secretary of State, Edmund Muskie (1936), U.S. Attorney General Robert F. Kennedy (1944), and Clerk of the Supreme Court of the United States John F. Davis (1928). As of November 2018, the college has had 12 United States Congress members among its alumni: John Swasey (1859), Daniel McGillicuddy (1881), Carroll Beedy (1903), Charles Clason (1911), Donald Partridge (1914), Edmund Muskie (1936), Frank Coffin (1940), Robert F. Kennedy (1944), Leo Ryan (1944), Bob Goodlatte (1974), Ben Cline (1994), and Jared Golden (2011). In state government, Bates alumni have led all three political branches in Maine, graduating two Chief Justices of the Maine Supreme Court, two Maine Governors, and multiple leaders of both state houses. Notable military people include Brevet Major Holman Melcher (1862), as well as Medal of Honor recipients Frederick Hayes (1861), Josiah Chase (1861), Joseph F. Warren (1862), Lewis Millet (1943), Aaron Daggett (1860), and James Porter (1863).

Bates alumni in business, finance, and economics include: General Mills CEO Robert Kinney (1939), Fidelity Fund managing director Barry Greenfield (1956), Analysis Group founder Bruce Stangle (1970), Merrill Lynch CFO Joseph Willit (1973), Japonica Partners CEO Paul Kazarian (1978), L Catterton CEO Michael Chu (1980), Cubist Pharmaceuticals CEO Michael Bonney (1980), National Bank of Canada CEO Louis Vachon (1983), and Affiliated Managers Group CFO Darrell Crate (1989). In literature, music, journalism, television, and film, the following attended Bates: actors Jeffery Lynn (1930), John Shea (1970), Maria Bamford (1990–92), Bryant Gumbel (1970), writers Jeffrey K. Tulis (1972), Elizabeth Strout (1977), Lisa Genova (1992), and Brian McGrory (1984) and musician Corey Harris (1991). Bates counts 12 Olympian alumni: Vaughn Blanchard (1912), Harlan Holden (1913), Ray Buker (1922), Art Sager (1926), Arnold Adams (1933), Nancy Fiddler (1978), Mike Ferry (1997), Justin Freeman (1998), Andrew Byrnes (2005), Hayley Johnson (2006), Emily Bamford (2015), and Dinos Lefkaritis (2019).

Administration

Leadership 

Bates College is governed by its central administration, headquartered in and metonymically known as "Lane Hall". The first president of the college was its founder, Oren Burbank Cheney and its president is Clayton Spencer, who took office October 26, 2012. There have been eight presidents of Bates College, and one interim president. The president is ex officio a member and president of the board of trustees, chief executive officer of the corporation, and principal academic of the college.

There are 37 members on the Bates College board of trustees. The chairman of the board is 1980 alumnus and founder of Prospector Partners, John Gillespie.

Endowment and fundraising 
As a tax-exempt nonprofit organization, Bates is classified under section 501(c) of the U.S. Internal Revenue Code. The endowment surpasses the national average, yet has been seen as a laggard compared to its direct peers. During the first half-century of the college, the endowment grew at an exponentially high rate, topping off at $1 million in 1910, as Yale University, then 207 years old, stood at $12 million. "Lackluster fundraising, poor governance, and divestments" from the 1960s to 1980s, "cost Bates hundreds of millions" according to a 2019-20 The Student/BCIC academic study. During the 2007–08 financial crisis and subsequent recession, the college's endowment lost 31% of market value. The Bates endowment consistently outperformed peers in market returns, particularly against fellow NESCAC colleges and the Ivy League from 2010 to 2018. Its low endowment-to-student ratio increases the college's fee dependency and therefore overall sticker price, frequently making Bates one of the most expensive colleges to attend in the United States.

As of the 2016 fiscal year, the college received $28.2 million in overall donations demonstrating a 134% increase in giving since 2013, and breaking the previous 2006 record of $24.8 million. In May 2017 president Clayton Spencer announced the "Bates+You" fundraising campaign, the largest ever undertaken by the college, due to close out on $300 million.

In 2014, members of the student advocacy group, Bates Energy Action Movement (BEAM), requested the college divest from 200 companies that held the largest fossil fuel reserves. In response the college asserted the board of trustees had a fiduciary responsibility to the growth of the endowment and declined to specifically divest from the companies. However, in accordance with the student's request the college did disclose its full investment strategy, and commented on the long term implications of divestment by saying:

In fiction and literature 

Throughout its history, the college has been featured in literature, artistic works, and overall popular culture.

See also 

 New England Small College Athletic Conference
 List of colleges and universities in Maine
 Hidden Ivies: Thirty Colleges of Excellence
 Liberal arts colleges in the United States
 List of colleges and universities in Maine

Notes

References

Further reading 

 Alfred, Williams Anthony. Bates College and Its Background. (1936) Online Deposit.
 Stuan, Thomas. The Architecture of Bates College. (2006)
 Chase, Harry. Bates College was named after Mansfield Man. (1878)
 Woz, Markus. Bates College – Traditionally Unconventional. (2002)
 Bates College Archives. Bates College Catalog. (1956–2017). 2017 Catalog.
 Bates College Archives. Maine State Seminary Records. Online Deposit.
 Bates College Archives. Bates College Oral History Project. Online Deposit.
 Clark, Charles E. Bates Through the Years: an Illustrated History. (2005)
 Smith, Dana. Bates College – U. S. Navy V-12 Program Collection. (1943) Online Deposit.
 Eaton, Mabel. General Catalogue of Bates College and Cobb Divinity School. (1930)
 Larson, Timothy. Faith by Their Works: The Progressive Tradition at Bates College. (2005)
 Calhoun, Charles C. A Small College in Maine. p. 163. (1993)
 Johnnett, R. F. Bates Student: A Monthly Magazine. (1878)
 Phillips, F. Charles Bates College in Maine: Enduring Strength and Scholarship. Issue 245. (1952)
 Dormin J. Ettrude, Edith M. Phelps, Julia Emily Johnsen. French Occupation of the Ruhr: Bates College Versus Oxford Union Society of Oxford College. (1923)
 The Bates Student. The Voice of Bates College. (1873–2017)
 Emeline Cheney; Burlingame, Aldrich. The story of the life and work of Oren Burbank Cheney, founder and first president of Bates College. (1907) Online Version.

External links 

 
 Bates Athletics Website

 
Educational institutions established in 1855
Liberal arts colleges in Maine
Education in Lewiston, Maine
Universities and colleges in Androscoggin County, Maine
Educational buildings in Lewiston, Maine
1855 establishments in Maine
Private universities and colleges in Maine
Free Will Baptist schools